Gaeldom may refer to:

Areas in which some Gaelic languages (Scottish Gaelic and Manx) are spoken
Gàidhealtachd, areas of Scotland where Scottish Gaelic is spoken

See also
Permanent North American Gaeltacht